Terence Blacker FRSL (born 5 February 1948, near Hadleigh, Suffolk) is an English songwriter, author and columnist.



Biography
Blacker is the son of General Sir Cecil Blacker, and the brother of sculptor and former jockey Philip Blacker.

He grew up on the family farm in Suffolk. He attended Hawtreys preparatory school and Wellington College before reading English at Trinity College, Cambridge, whence he graduated in 1969.

Blacker began his working life in horse-racing and as an amateur jockey. Subsequently, he worked in publishing for 10 years during the 1970s and 1980s, where he was responsible for overseeing the publication of works by Jerzy Kosinski.

Blacker became a full-time writer in 1983 and has written children's books and mysteries for adults. His first children's book If I Could Work was published in 1987 and his first adult novel, FIXX, won critical acclaim and was described by The Guardian as a "tour de force". He is an active member of English PEN, and is also an EAW member.

In 1975 he married Caroline Soper, youngest daughter of the radical Methodist minister Donald Soper (div. 2001). They have two children Xan and Alice. Blacker's partner is now Angela Sykes.

He writes the "Endpaper" for The Author. For many years, he wrote the "Harvey Porlock" column in The Sunday Times, as well as a column about the book business for Publishing News.
His regular writing for The Independent, newspaper, usually consisting of twice-weekly columns, came to an end in December 2013 after nearly 16 years.

Blacker was elected a Fellow of the Royal Society of Literature in 2017.

Bibliography
Adult books
You Cannot Live as I Have Lived and Not End Up Like This: The Thoroughly Disgraceful Life and Times of Willie Donaldson (Ebury Press, 2007) 
Kill Your Darlings (Weidenfeld & Nicolson, 2000) 
Revenance (Bloomsbury, 1996) 
The Fame Hotel (Bloomsbury, 1992) 
Fixx (Bloomsbury, 1989) 
Children's books
Missing, Believed Crazy (Macmillan Children's, July 2009) 
Parentswap (Farrar Straus Giroux, August 2006) 
Tinseltown (Macmillan Children's Books, January 2005) 
Boy2girl (Macmillan Children's Books, 2004) 
You Have Ghost Mail (Macmillan Children's Books, 2002) 
The Angel Factory (Simon & Schuster Books for Young Readers, 2002) 
The Transfer (Macmillan Children's Books, 1998) 
Nasty Neighbours / Nice Neighbours (Macmillan Children's Books, 1992) 
Homebird (Piccadilly Press, 1991)  (Prentice Hall & IBD, 1993 )
If I Could Work (Lippincott Williams & Wilkins, 1991) 
The Surprising Adventures of Baron Munchausen (Hodder Children's Books, 1990) 
Herbie Hamster, Where Are You? by Terence Blacker, Pippa Unwin (Random House Children's Books, 1990) 
Houdini, the Disappearing Hamster (Andersen Press, 1990) 
Henry and the Frights (Piccadilly Press, 1989) 
Neil's Book of the Dead by Terence Blacker, Nigel Planer (Pavilion Books, 1984) 
    'Girl power' by Terence Blacker

Ms Wiz series
Out of Control, Ms Wiz (Macmillan Children's Books, 2009) 
Fangtastic, Ms Wiz Mayhem (Macmillan Children's Books, 2008) 
Totally Spaced, Ms Wiz (Macmillan Children's Books, 2008) 
Ms Wiz Mayhem (Macmillan Children's Books, 2006) 
Ms Wiz Superstar (Macmillan Children's Books, 2004) 
The Crazy World of Ms Wiz (Macmillan Children's Books, 2004) 
The Secret Life of Ms Wiz (Macmillan Children's Books, 2002) 
Ms Wiz: Millionaire (Macmillan Children's Books, 2001) 
Ms Wiz Goes to Hollywood (Macmillan Children's Books, 2000) 
Ms Wiz and the Sister of Doom (Macmillan Children's Books, 1999) 
Ms Wiz Smells a Rat (Macmillan Children's Books, 1998) 
Ms Wiz Supermodel (Macmillan Children's Books, 1997) 
You're Kidding Me, Ms Wiz (Macmillan Children's Books, 1996) 
Ms Wiz Loves Dracula (Macmillan Children's Books, 1993)  (Piccadilly Press, 1993 )
Power-crazy Ms Wiz (Macmillan Children's Books, 1993)  (Piccadilly Press, 1992 )
Time Flies for Ms Wiz (Macmillan Children's Books, 1993)  (Piccadilly Press, 1992 )
Ms Wiz Banned! (Macmillan Children's Books, 1993)  (Piccadilly Press, 1990 )
Ms Wiz Goes Live (Macmillan Children's Books, 1993)  (Piccadilly Press, 1990 )
In Control, Ms Wiz? (Macmillan Children's Books, 1993)  (Piccadilly Press, 1990 )
You're Nicked, Ms Wiz (Macmillan Children's Books, 1993)  (Piccadilly Press, 1989 )
In Stitches with Ms Wiz (Macmillan Children's Books, 1993)  (Piccadilly Press, 1989 )
    
-022-X)

See also

AGA saga

References

External links
TerenceBlacker.com Official website featuring his books for adults and children, latest articles, blogs and news.
Column archive at The Independent
Terence Blacker at Journalisted

Terence Blacker Questions & Answers from Writers OnlineRegional/Europe/United_Kingdom/News_and_Media/Columnists/Blacker,_Terence

1948 births
Living people
Alumni of Trinity College, Cambridge
English columnists
20th-century English novelists
21st-century English novelists
People from Hadleigh, Suffolk
English children's writers
English male novelists
Fellows of the Royal Society of Literature
20th-century English male writers
21st-century English male writers
People educated at Hawtreys
English male non-fiction writers